Castellia is a genus of African and Eurasian plants in the grass family. The only known species is Castellia tuberculosa, native to southern Europe (Spain, Sardinia, Greece), northern and northeastern Africa (Algeria, Libya, Morocco, Tunisia, Djibouti, Eritrea, Somalia, Sudan), and southwestern Asia (Saudi Arabia, Oman, Persian Gulf Sheikdoms, Iran, Pakistan, Punjab State of India).

See also
 List of Poaceae genera

References

Pooideae
Monotypic Poaceae genera
Flora of Asia
Flora of Africa